Joram may refer to:
Joram (given name)
Jehoram (disambiguation) (meaning "God is exalted" in Biblical Hebrew)
Joram, Arunachal Pradesh, a village panchayat in India
JORAM, an open source implementation of the Java Message Service
Joram MacRorie, a fictional character in the Deryni novels by Katherine Kurtz
Joram, a fictional character in the Darksword novels by Margaret Weis and Tracy Hickman